Major-General Sir Henry Torrens  (1779 – 23 August 1828) was an Adjutant-General to the Forces.

Early life
Torrens was born in Derry, Ireland in 1779. He was the youngest son of the Reverend Thomas Torrens and his wife Elizabeth Curry. He lost both his parents at an early age, and was educated at a military academy in Dublin. Robert Torrens, judge of the Court of Common Pleas (Ireland), was his brother and Robert's namesake Colonel Robert Torrens, the economist, was his first cousin. The family was of Swedish origin, and came to Ireland about 1690 with William of Orange.

Military career
Torrens was commissioned as an ensign into the 52nd (Oxfordshire) Regiment of Foot in 1793 at the age of 14. In 1796 he served under Abercrombie in the West Indies, where he displayed great bravery, was wounded, and rewarded with a company. He served in Portugal in 1798; in Holland under the Duke of York in 1799; and afterwards in Nova Scotia, Egypt, and India.

In 1799 Torrens went to Den Helder where he was involved in battles at Hoorne and at Egmond aan Zee: at the latter, he was wounded by a bullet. In 1805 he was promoted to the rank of lieutenant-colonel. After seeing service at Buenos Aires in 1807, he accompanied Sir Arthur Wellesley as military secretary to Portugal in 1808, and was present at the battles of Roliça and Vimeiro.

Torrens rose to be appointed Military Secretary in 1809. He attained the rank of major-general in 1814, and was gazetted K.C.B. and then Adjutant-General to the Forces in 1820.

Torrens died while out riding with his wife and daughters at Welwyn, Hertfordshire on 23 August 1828, aged 48.

Family
In 1803 he married Sarah Patton at St. Helena, the daughter of the Governor of St. Helena, and together they went on to have four sons and two daughters.

References

1779 births
1828 deaths
52nd Regiment of Foot officers
Queen's Royal Regiment officers
West India Regiment officers
Knights Commander of the Order of the Bath
British Army generals
Irish people of Swedish descent
Torrens family
Military personnel from Derry (city)
British Army personnel of the French Revolutionary Wars
British Army personnel of the Napoleonic Wars